Luise Neumann (7 December 1818 – 17 October 1905) was a German actress, the daughter of the actress Amalie Haizinger. Her younger sister, was also an esteemed actress of the period.

She made her debut at the age of 16 in a performance of the Deutschen Hausfrau in Karlsruhe. In 1839, she joined the Burgtheater in Vienna, of which she was a member until 1856. On 14 January 1857, she married Karl Graf von Schönfeld and ended her career as an actor.

1818 births
1905 deaths
19th-century German actresses
German stage actresses